Olivia Maria Oprea (born 19 March 1987), commonly known in Spain as Oli, is a Romanian professional footballer who plays as a centre-back and a defensive midfielder for Spanish Primera División club Villarreal CF and the Romania national team. She has also played in Spain for Sporting Huelva and Sevilla FC, as well as in Greece's A Division for Amazones Dramas, and in the 2005-06 UEFA Women's Cup with Kazakhstan's Alma KTZh. In 2011–2012 she went back to Romania to represent Olimpia Cluj of the Liga I.

She is a member of the Romanian national team.

References

External links
 
 
 

1987 births
Living people
Romanian women's footballers
Romania women's international footballers
Expatriate women's footballers in Kazakhstan
Expatriate women's footballers in Spain
Expatriate women's footballers in Greece
BIIK Kazygurt players
Primera División (women) players
Sporting de Huelva players
Romanian expatriate sportspeople in Kazakhstan
Romanian expatriate sportspeople in Spain
Romanian expatriate sportspeople in Greece
Sportspeople from Târgoviște
Sevilla FC (women) players
Levante UD Femenino players
Zaragoza CFF players
Villarreal CF (women) players
Romanian expatriate footballers
Segunda Federación (women) players
Women's association football central defenders
Women's association football midfielders
FCU Olimpia Cluj players
Alhama CF players